Lilium 'Stargazer' (the 'Stargazer lily') is a hybrid lily of the 'Oriental group'. Oriental lilies are known for their fragrant perfume, blooming mid-to-late summer. Stargazers are easy to grow and do best in full sunlight.
They have a fast growth rate and should be planted in full sun in well-drained loamy or sandy soil. When mature, 'Stargazers' can grow to a height of 36 inches with a spread of 10 to 14 inches with 2 to 8 flowers per stem.

Stargazer lilies are often incorrectly called "Rubrum" lilies. Rubrums were a predecessor commercial lily to the 'Stargazers' whose flowers pointed down to the ground. As such, consumers and other end users thought the Rubrums' downward-facing flowers looked wilted. The 'Stargazer' lily was created in 1974 by Leslie Woodriff, a lily breeder in California, to overcome this downward look. Woodriff called the new cross 'Stargazer', because the blooms faced towards the sky.

Many commercial florists report that while most consumers love the appearance and the fragrance of the Stargazer lily and other Oriental lilies (e.g. 'Sorbonne', 'Starfighter' in the pink and 'Siberia', 'Casa Blanca' in the white), there is a small minority of the public that does not like the fragrance.

In the early part of the 21st Century, Sun Valley Farms in California, a large commercial flower farm, developed a pink lily similar looking to the Stargazer that had no fragrance. The farm discontinued production of this variety due to lack of demand.

The ASPCA reports this plant as being toxic to cats. They are said to cause vomiting, inappetence, lethargy, kidney failure, and even death. Cats are the only species known to be affected. The National Animal Poison Control Center says that certain types of lilies can cause kidney failure in cats that have ingested any part of the lily. The Society of American Florists, a floral industry umbrella organization, recommends keeping lilies out of the reach of cats. It is important to note that lilies do not pose a problem for other pets or humans. The Cat Fanciers' Association suggests alternatives: Easter orchids, Easter cacti, Easter daisies or violets.

References 

Stargazer
Ornamental plant cultivars